Petter Øgar (born 5 September 1953) is a Norwegian physician and civil servant.

He was born in Oslo, and graduated with the cand.med. degree in 1978. 
He worked at Kongsberg Hospital from 1980 to 1983. He was district physician in Stryn from 1983 to 1984 and municipal physician in Hornindal from 1984 to 1995, and from 1995 he was the county physician in Sogn og Fjordane, residing in Sogndal.

In 2000, when director of the Norwegian Board of Health Supervision Anne Alvik was first granted a six-month absence of leave, Øgar became acting director. He was succeeded by another acting director, Lars E. Hanssen, in the autumn. From October 2010 Øgar is a deputy under-secretary of state for the Department of Municipal Health Care Services in the Ministry of Health and Care Services.

In his younger days he was an able long-distance runner, with personal best times of 9:31.6 (3000 metres steeplechase), 14:47.8 (5000 metres), 30:49.0 (10,000 metres) and 2:37:18 (marathon)—all achieved in 1977. He represented the club Grorud IL.

References

1953 births
Living people
Physicians from Oslo
Norwegian municipal physicians
Directors of government agencies of Norway
Norwegian male long-distance runners
Norwegian male steeplechase runners
Norwegian healthcare managers